The Melanesia Cup 1989 was the second Melanesia-wide tournament ever held. It took place in Fiji and five teams participated: Fiji, Solomon Islands, New Caledonia, Vanuatu and for the first time Papua New Guinea.

The teams played each other according to a round-robin format with Fiji winning the tournament.

Results

Melanesia Cup
1989–90 in OFC football
1989
1989 in Fijian sport
October 1989 sports events in Oceania
November 1989 sports events in Oceania